In mathematics, the Steinberg representation, or Steinberg module or Steinberg character,  denoted by St, is a particular linear representation of a reductive algebraic group over a finite field or local field, or a group with a BN-pair. It is analogous to the 1-dimensional sign representation ε of a Coxeter or Weyl group that takes all reflections to –1.

Over a finite field of characteristic p, the Steinberg representation has degree equal to the largest power of p dividing the order of the group.

The Steinberg representation is the Alvis–Curtis dual of the trivial 1-dimensional representation.

For the general linear group GL(2), the dimension of the Jacquet module of a special representation is always one.

The Steinberg representation of a finite group
The character value of St on an element g equals, up to sign, the order of a Sylow subgroup of the centralizer of g if g has order prime to p, and is zero if the order of g is divisible by p.
The Steinberg representation is equal to an alternating sum over all parabolic subgroups containing a Borel subgroup, of the representation induced from the identity representation of the parabolic subgroup.
The Steinberg representation is both regular and unipotent, and is the only irreducible regular unipotent representation (for the given prime p).
The Steinberg representation is used in the proof of Haboush's theorem (the Mumford conjecture).

Most finite simple groups have exactly one Steinberg representation. A few have more than one because they are 
groups of Lie type in more than one way.  For symmetric groups (and other Coxeter groups) the sign representation is analogous to the Steinberg representation. Some of the sporadic simple groups act as doubly transitive permutation groups so have a BN-pair for which one can define a Steinberg representation, but for most of the sporadic groups there is no known analogue of it.

The Steinberg representation of a p-adic group

 and  showed how to realize the Steinberg representation in the cohomology group H(X) of the Bruhat–Tits building of the group.

References

 Finite Groups of Lie Type: Conjugacy Classes and Complex Characters (Wiley Classics Library) by Roger W. Carter, John Wiley & Sons Inc; New Ed edition (August 1993) 

R. Steinberg,   Collected Papers, Amer. Math. Soc.  (1997)   pp. 580–586

Representation theory of algebraic groups
Finite fields